Lieutenant General Sir Louis Jean Bols   (23 November 1867 – 13 September 1930) was a British Army General, he served as Edmund Allenby's Third Army Chief of Staff on the Western Front and Sinai and Palestine campaigns of World War I. From 1927 onto his death he served as the Governor of Bermuda.

Early life
Bols was born in Cape Town and educated at Lancing College in England and Bishop's College School in Canada.

Military career

He was commissioned a second lieutenant in the Devonshire Regiment on 5 February 1887, and was promoted to lieutenant on 22 September 1889. In 1891-92 he served in Burma, including operations in the Kachin Hills, and received the operational medal with clasp. In 1895 he served with the Chitral Relief Force under Sir Robert Low as adjutant and quartermaster at the British Military Depot. Promotion to captain followed on 18 January 1897, and he served as adjutant of the 2nd Battalion of his regiment from 17 February 1899.

Following the outbreak of the Second Boer War in late 1899, his battalion was sent to South Africa, where he served as adjutant of the battalion throughout the war. He was present at the battles of Colenso (15 December 1899), Vaal Krantz (5–7 February 1900), Tugela Heights and Pieter's Hill (14–27 February 1900) and the Relief of Ladysmith (1 March 1900), and later in operations in the Transvaal and Orange River Colony. For his services in the war, he was twice mentioned in despatches, received the Queen's South Africa Medal and was appointed a Companion of the Distinguished Service Order (DSO). After peace was declared in May 1902, Bols left South Africa on board the SS Bavarian and arrived in the United Kingdom the following month.

He took command of the Dorsetshire Regiment in 1914 at the start of the First World War.

At the Second Battle of Ypres in 1915 Bols held the command of the 84th (Infantry) Brigade. Later in that year he was attached to Headquarters of Third Army, as General Sir Edmund Allenby's Chief of Staff, and served in the latter capacity, both on the Western Front in 1916, and in 1917–18 in Palestine.

From January to June 1920 he served as the Chief Administrator of Palestine, and signed over power to Herbert Samuel, the first British High Commissioner of Palestine, who confirmed in an often-quoted document:
"Received from Major-General Sir Louis J. Bols K.C.B.—One Palestine, complete."

Bols went on to become General Officer Commanding 43rd (Wessex) Infantry Division in September 1920. From 1927 to his death he was Governor and General Officer Commanding of the army garrison of the Imperial fortress colony of Bermuda. He also served as colonel of the Devonshire Regiment from 1921 to his death.

Bols died in his 63rd year on 13 September 1930 in a nursing home in the city of Bath, Somerset, while on leave from Bermuda.

Personal life
He married Augusta Blanche Strickland and had two sons, Major-General Eric Bols, and Maj. Kenneth Bols (killed in action in Italy in World War II).

References

External links
Louis Jean Bols bio at firstworldwar.com
Bols, LJ at angloboerwar.com

|-

|-

1867 births
1930 deaths
Administrators of Palestine
British Army generals of World War I
British Army personnel of the Second Boer War
British military personnel of the Chitral Expedition
British people of Belgian descent
Companions of the Distinguished Service Order
Devonshire Regiment officers
Governors of Bermuda
Knights Commander of the Order of St Michael and St George
Knights Commander of the Order of the Bath
Recipients of the Legion of Honour
People educated at Lancing College
British Army lieutenant generals
Military personnel from Cape Town
Bishop's College School alumni
Recipients of the Order of St. Vladimir
Recipients of the Order of the Rising Sun, 2nd class